Group B of the 2010 Fed Cup Asia/Oceania Zone Group II was one of two pools in the Asia/Oceania Zone Group II of the 2010 Fed Cup. Three teams competed in a round robin competition, with the teams proceeding to their respective sections of the play-offs: the top team played for advancement to the 2011 Group I.

Hong Kong vs. Syria

Philippines vs. Kyrgyzstan

Hong Kong vs. Philippines

Syria vs. Kyrgyzstan

Hong Kong vs. Kyrgyzstan

Philippines vs. Syria

See also
Fed Cup structure

References

External links
 Fed Cup website

2010 Fed Cup Asia/Oceania Zone